= Ayesha Shelton =

American real estate professional

- Born: Galveston, Texas, US
- Occupation: Real estate
- Known for: Co-founder of Park Street Homes
- Spouse: Kevan Shelton
- Children: 3

Ayesha Shelton is an American entrepreneur and real estate professional. She is known for co-founding Park Street Homes, a real-estate company in Houston.

== Career ==
=== Real estate development ===
Shelton along with her husband Kevan Shelton co-founded Park Street Homes, a company that focuses on developing residential properties with an emphasis on affordable luxury. The company has been involved in projects aimed at revitalizing areas in Houston.

=== Community engagement ===
Shelton has been involved in community service and preservation efforts in Houston. She co-chaired the Good Brick Tour for Preservation Houston, an event that showcases and highlights the city's historical landmarks.

Her accomplishments earned her a spot on the Houston Business Journal's Forty Under 40 list in 2022.

== Personal life ==
Shelton resides in Houston, Texas, with her husband, Kevan and their three children.
