= Kevan Shelton =

American businessman

- Born: Texas, United States
- Citizenship: American
- Occupation: Businessman
- Known for: Co-founding residential housing provider Park Street Homes
- Title: Chief Executive Officer
- Spouse: Ayesha Shelton
- Children: 3

Kevan Shelton is an American businessman. He is the co-founder and CEO of Park Street Homes, a Houston-based real-estate company.

Shelton, along with his wife Ayesha, founded Park Street Homes with the goal of developing residential housing. The company has been featured in media outlets for its work in homebuilding and community development. In 2023, Shelton and his wife launched the Black Men Buy Houses initiative to provide resources and support for Black men interested in homeownership.
